In cryptography, differential equations of addition (DEA) are one of the most basic equations related to differential cryptanalysis that mix additions over two different groups (e.g. addition modulo 232 and addition over GF(2)) and  where input and output differences are expressed as XORs.

Examples 
Differential equations of addition (DEA) are of the following form:

The symbols  and  denote addition modulo  and bitwise exclusive-or respectively.

Let a set 

 

It has been proved that the satisfiability of an arbitrary set of DEA is in the complexity class P when a brute force search requires an exponential time. 

Based on the found properties, an algorithm for deriving  was proposed and analyzed.

Applications 
Solution to an arbitrary set of DEA (either in batch and or in adaptive query model) was due to Souradyuti Paul and Bart Preneel. The solution techniques have been used to attack the stream cipher Helix.

Further reading 
 Souradyuti Paul and Bart Preneel, Solving Systems of Differential Equations of Addition, ACISP 2005.  Full version (PDF)
 Souradyuti Paul and Bart Preneel, Near Optimal Algorithms for Solving Differential Equations of Addition With Batch Queries, Indocrypt 2005.  Full version (PDF)
 Helger Lipmaa, Johan Wallén, Philippe Dumas: On the Additive Differential Probability of Exclusive-Or. FSE 2004: 317-331.

References 

Cryptographic attacks
Theory of cryptography
Ciphers
Algebra